William Wenthe is an American poet and professor. His most recent poetry collection is Words Before Dawn (Louisiana State University Press, 2013). His poems have appeared in literary journals and magazines including Georgia Review, Southern Review, Callaloo, Tin House, Paris Review, Poetry, and in anthologies including Poets on Place (Utah State University Press, 2005). His honors include a Pushcart Prize and fellowships from the National Endowment for the Arts and the Texas Commission on the Arts.

Born and raised in New Jersey, Wenthe earned his B.A. from College of the Holy Cross, and his M.A. and Ph.D. from University of Virginia. He lives in Lubbock with his wife, the poet Jacqueline Kolosov, and their daughter Sophia. He teaches at Texas Tech University and is the poetry editor for Iron Horse Literary Review.

Published works
 Words Before Dawn (Louisiana State University Press, 2012) 
 Not Till We Are Lost (Louisiana State University Press, 2003)
 Birds of Hoboken (Orchises Press, 1995)

Honors and awards
 2009 Everett Southwest Literary Award
 2004 Natalie Ornish Best Book of Poetry Award
 1995 National Endowment for the Arts Fellowship

References

External links
 Author Page: William Wenthe > Louisiana State University Press
 Faculty Page: William Wenthe > Texas Tech University
 Poem: AGNI Online > 2008 > Goldsmith and Charity by William Wenthe
 Poem: Callaloo > Volume 32, Number 1, Winter 2009 > Reading by William Wenthe

American male poets
Living people
Poets from New Jersey
Poets from Texas
National Endowment for the Arts Fellows
University of Virginia alumni
College of the Holy Cross alumni
Texas Tech University faculty
Year of birth missing (living people)